Oothout Zabriskie Whitehead (March 1, 1911 – July 29, 1998) was an American  stage and film character actor. He was born in New York City and attended Harvard University.  Called "O.Z." or "Zebby", he also authored several volumes of biographical sketches of early members of the Baháʼí Faith especially in the West after he moved ("pioneered" as a Baháʼí) to Dublin, Ireland in 1963.

Film, TV and theatre actor
Whitehead first appeared on Broadway in Martin Beck Theatre performing in The Lake (1933) in 55 performances from December 1933 to February 1934 (which was Katharine Hepburn's first Broadway leading role) and 11 other plays by 1939. Hepburn encouraged his early career.

O. Z. Whitehead was one of the last surviving members of John Ford's "stock company" of character actors. Along with John Carradine, Donald Meek, Ward Bond, Ben Johnson, Harry Carey, Jr. et al., Whitehead was one of the many actors regularly employed by Ford to breathe life into even the smallest roles in his films. His best-known part was that of Al in Ford's 1940 adaptation of John Steinbeck's novel The Grapes of Wrath.

Whitehead's film debut was in The Scoundrel (1935) by Ben Hecht, and Charles MacArthur which won a 1936 Oscar for Best Original Story  Whitehead most famously played Al Joad (Henry Fonda's younger brother) in John Steinbeck's Grapes of Wrath (1940) which was nominated for, and won, several Oscars. Whitehead starred as Clarence in a stage production of Life with Father with Lillian Gish among a total of more than 50 films and TV series episodes  performances. Whitehead's first TV episode was The Arrow and the Bow in Cavalcade of America in 1953 and continued in other shows like Gunsmoke (1958), Bonanza (1960), and two episodes of Alfred Hitchcock Presents (1960–61). In 1961 he made a guest appearance on Perry Mason as murderer Harry Beacom in "The Case of the Cowardly Lion." Shortly thereafter Whitehead moved to Ireland and participated in theatre arts there.

In 1966 he won the Best Supporting Actor award at the Dublin Theatre Festival for his performance in Eugene O'Neill's Hughie, a part he was to reprise at the Peacock until 1989. In 1983 he played the role of American Ambassador David Gray in the RTÉ television drama Caught in a Free State, set in neutral Ireland during World War II. His final role was as the narrator/Voice in the Irish horror film Biological Maintenance Department (1997).

Following his move to Ireland he established the "O. Z. Whitehead Award" supporting theatre in 1966, the first year including Dr. Michael McDonnell, for his play All Gods Die on Friday. Other winners have been Ivy Bannister, Aodhan Madden, and Francis Harvey.

Personal life
As a child he was fascinated by films and the theatre and decided to make his career as an actor after his father took him to see Charlie Chaplin and Jackie Coogan in The Kid in 1921. After years in stage, film and television Whitehead struggled in the Hollywood Studio system, a pacifist in World War II and became dissatisfied with the roles he was given, and then first heard of the Baháʼí Faith in 1949. At his first informational meeting on the religion, Whitehead heard well-known researcher Marzieh Gail. Whitehead joined the religion late in 1950, gave public talks on the religion such as at World Religion Day observances and other occasions in the 1950s, went on pilgrimage to its spiritual and administrative center in Haifa in 1955. He also attended the first Baháʼí World Congress in 1963 in London. He then pioneered to Ireland while also taking to the Dublin theatrical opportunities. Whitehead was elected to the Local Spiritual Assembly of Dublin and the National Spiritual Assembly of Ireland on which he served for 15 years following its formation in 1972. From about 1973 through the end of his life Whitehead devoted much of his time to the concerns of the religion including work resulting in publishing three books collecting biographies of early Baháʼís while in his 6th decade but he also supported the Irish Actors' Equity and the Screen Actors' Guild and served on the executive of the Irish branch of PEN, the international writers' club.

Although Zebbie Whitehead never married, he was in a long-term and very private relationship with actress Katharine Hepburn. The couple met through Dick Hepburn, who studied at Harvard University with Zebbie. After they agreed to part, Zebbie was never known to be in another relationship.

Death
Whitehead died of cancer in Dublin in 1998, at the age of 87.

Partial filmography

 The Scoundrel (1935) - Calhoun
 M'Liss (1936) - Sheriff (uncredited)
 The Grapes of Wrath (1940) - Al Joad
 To the Shores of Tripoli (1942) - Marine Recruit (uncredited)
 My Brother Talks to Horses (1947) - Mr. Puddy
 The Romance of Rosy Ridge (1947) - Ninny Nat
 The Pirate (1948) - Hurtada (uncredited)
 A Song Is Born (1948) - Professor Oddly
 Road House (1948) - Arthur
 Family Honeymoon (1948) - Jess (uncredited)
 Ma and Pa Kettle (1949) - Mr. Billings
 One Way Street (1950) - Gas Station Proprietor (uncredited)
 Dallas (1950) - Settler (uncredited)
 The Scarf (1951) - Whoopie (uncredited)
 The Hoodlum (1951) - Breckenridge
 Comin' Round the Mountain (1951) - Zeke
 Journey Into Light (1951) - Lippy
 FBI Girl (1951) - Chauncey - Undertaker
 For Men Only (1952) - Prof. Bixby
 The San Francisco Story (1952) - Alfey
 We're Not Married! (1952) - Jeff's Postman (uncredited)
 Beware, My Lovely (1952) - Mr. Franks
 Feudin' Fools (1952) - Yancy Smith
 The Body Beautiful (1953) - Oscar Blunt
 The Last Hurrah (1958) - Norman Cass Jr.
 Rally Round the Flag, Boys! (1958) - Isaac Goodpasture
 The Horse Soldiers (1959) - Hoppy Hopkins
 Chartroose Caboose (1960) - J.B. King
 Two Rode Together (1961) - Lt. Chase
 The Man Who Shot Liberty Valance (1962) - Herbert Carruthers
 Panic in Year Zero! (1962) - Hogan - Grocery Store Owner
 Summer Magic (1963) - Mr. Perkins
 Ulysses (1967) - Alexander J. Dowie
 The Lion in Winter (1968) - Bishop of Durham
 Philadelphia, Here I Come (1977) - Ben Burton
 Diary of a Madman (1990) - Lunatic
 Hello Stranger (1992) - Head Waiter
 Ailsa (1994) - American tourist

Publications
 
 

 He also wrote an autobiographical 35 page chapter in

References

External links

St. Mark's School (Massachusetts) alumni
Harvard University alumni
American Bahá'ís
Irish Bahá'ís
American male film actors
Irish male film actors
American male stage actors
Irish male stage actors
American male television actors
1911 births
1998 deaths
Converts to the Bahá'í Faith
20th-century Bahá'ís
20th-century American male actors
20th-century Irish male actors